The 1890 Springfield YMCA football team, also known as the Christian Workers and the Staggs, was an American football team that represented the International Young Men's Christian Association Training School—now known as Springfield College–as an independent during the 1890 college football season. Led by first-year head coach Amos Alonzo Staggh, the team compiled a record of 5–3.

Schedule

References

Springfield Training School
Springfield Pride football seasons
Springfield Training School football